David Young is an English former professional football midfielder. He played in the English Football League for Wigan Athletic.

Young was a junior with both Wrexham and Tranmere Rovers before attending and playing for the University of Manchester. He played four times for Mossley in the 1982–83 season, before joining Wigan Athletic. He played three times that season before leaving to join Oswestry Town.

He later played for Northwich Victoria.

References

Year of birth missing (living people)
Sportspeople from Birkenhead
Mossley A.F.C. players
Wigan Athletic F.C. players
Oswestry Town F.C. players
Northwich Victoria F.C. players
English Football League players
Alumni of the University of Manchester
Living people
Association football midfielders
English footballers